Print-through is a generally undesirable effect that arises in the use of magnetic tape for storing analog information, in particular music, caused by contact transfer of signal patterns from one layer of tape to another as it sits wound concentrically on a reel.

Explanation
Print-through is a category of noise caused by contact transfer of signal patterns from one layer of tape to another after it is wound onto a reel.

Print-through can take two forms:

 thermo-remanent magnetization induced by temperature, and 
 anhysteretic magnetization caused by an external magnetic field.

The former is unstable over time and can be easily erased by rewinding a tape and letting it sit so that the patterns formed by the contact of upper and lower layers begin to erase each other and form new patterns with the repositioning of upper/lower layers after rewinding. This type of contact printing begins immediately after a recording and increases over time at a rate dependent on the temperature of the storage conditions. Depending on tape formulation and type, a maximum level will be reached after a certain length of time, if it is not further disturbed physically or magnetically.

Audibility
The audibility of print noise caused by contact printing depends on a number of factors:
 the amount of print due to conditions of time and storage; 
 the thickness of the base film that acts as magnetic barrier (thin C-90 cassette tapes are more susceptible than studio mastering tapes that use a base film four times thicker);
 the stability of the magnetic particle used in the tape coating;
 the speed of the tape (the wavelengths of the prints shift so that higher speeds move printed signal closer to the range where the ear is more sensitive); the dynamics of the musical program (very quiet passages adjacent to sudden loud signals can expose the print signal transferred from the loud signal); and the wind of the tape (A-winds for cassettes with the magnetic layer facing outward have stronger print signals after a loud signal--"post-print"—than B-winds used in modern open-reel recorders that have stronger "pre-print" signals preceding a loud passage. echo.

Tape speed is a factor because of the shift in wavelengths. For example, the strongest print signal on a C-60 cassette running at 1.875 ips is about 426 Hz (605 Hz for a C-90), while an open-reel tape recorded at 7.5 ips would have its strongest signal at 630 Hz if the tape were a professional tape with a 1.5 mil base film or 852 Hz if the tape were a consumer version with a base film of 1.0 mil thickness.

Causes
The cause of print-through is due to an imbalance of magnetic and thermal energy in the magnetic particle. Once the magnetic energy is only 25 times greater than the thermal energy, the particle becomes unstable enough to be influenced by flux energy from the layer above or below the tape. The amount of magnetic energy depends on the coercivity of the particles, their shapes (long, thin particles make stronger "magnets"), the ratio of ideally shaped particles to defective particles, and their crystalline structures. Metal particles, although very small, have very high values of coercivity and are the most resistant to print-through effects because their magnetic energy is seldom challenged by thermal energy. Particles fractured by excessive milling prior to coating will increase levels of print depending on their ratio compared to their well-formed neighboring particles.

Anhysteretic print signals are almost as strong as intentionally recorded signals and are much more difficult to erase. This type of print noise is relatively rare because users are typically careful about accidentally exposing recordings to strong magnetic fields, and the magnetic influence of such fields decreases with distance.

Digital tapes can also be affected by contact print effects in a phenomenon known as "bit-shift" when upper or lower layers of tape cause a middle layer to alter the pulses recorded to represent binary information.

Video recording
Since analog video is recorded by frequency-modulation of the video signal, the FM capture effect shields the signal against this noise; however, the linear audio and (depending on format) chrominance signals of a video cassette may have some print effects.

While print-through is a form of unwanted noise, contact printing was used deliberately for high-speed recording (duplication, high speed en masse copying) of video tape, instead of having to record thousands of tapes on thousands of VCRs at normal playback speed, or recording the source material repeatedly in real time to large reels (without end caps) of tape (called pancakes) over 48 hours long to be inserted into cassettes. DuPont in conjunction with Otari invented a form of thermal magnetic duplication ("TMD") by which a high-coercivity metal mother master tape was brought into direct contact with a chromium dioxide copy (slave) tape. The coercivity of the mother tape is higher than that of the copy tape, so when the copy tape is heated and brought into contact with the mother tape, the copy tape gets a mirror image of the signal on the mother tape without the mother tape losing its signal. The recording on the mother tape was a mirror image of a valid video signal. Immediately before the copy tape came into contact with the mother tape, a focused laser beam heated it to its Curie point at which its value of coercivity dropped to very low values so that it picked up a near perfect copy of the mother tape as it cooled. The mother tape was made using a special reel to reel video tape recorder called a mirror master recorder and was held inside the machine in an endless loop. This system could achieve speeds of up to 300 times playback speed in NTSC VHS SP mode, 900 times in VHS EP mode and 428 times in PAL/SECAM tapes.

Sony developed a system known as "Sprinter" that used a similar mother master tape forced into close contact with any blank copy tape using compressed air and run across a rotating transfer head in which a weak AC high frequency sine wave is used to transfer the information anhysteretically to the copy tape with minimal erasure of the mother tape on each pass. The sprinter does not use a laser to heat the copy tape which saves on power consumption. The transfer head may have a vacuum cleaner to reduce dropout caused by dust. This system was used to quickly duplicate VHS tapes at speeds of up to 240 times faster than playback speed for NTSC and 342 times for PAL/SECAM video signals without having to use expensive chrome dioxide tape; the tape was fed into the sprinter at a speed of 8 meters per second. The mother tape was enclosed in a space (not in a reel, but rather in an endless loop) in the Sprinter; this was made possible by a horizontal vibrating tape feed system where the edge of the endless loop tape sits in a table that diagonally vibrates using vibration generated by piezoelectric elements and amplified using mechanical oscillation, causing the tape in the table to move forward. The copy tape was unwound, recorded using the mother tape, then wound onto large reels (called pancakes) containing enough tape for several VHS cassettes. The mother tape had a coercivity three times that of normal VHS tape and was made by recording onto it using a special reel to reel video tape recorder called a mirror mother VTR using video from a D-2 (video), Type B videotape or Type C videotape master source tape. The video tape recorder had a sapphire blade to clean the surface of the mother tape, reducing dropout caused by dust. Sprinter mother tapes did suffer enough loss that they had to be replaced after a number of passes. The master had to be replaced every 1000 copies.  This form of high-speed recording was very cost effective when recording in the EP (extra long play) mode because it was three times faster than recording in SP (standard play) mode while real-time recording took the same amount of time whether in EP mode that used less tape or SP mode that used a greater amount of tape. High-speed video recording of EP video produced far more consistent results than real-time recording at the slowest VHS speed. After duplication, the copy tape was loaded into video tape loaders that wound the tape into empty VHS cassette shells that contained only leader tape.

See also
 Pre-echo / post-echo
 Forward echo
 Crosstalk
 Audio spill
 Microphonics
 Glossary of jazz and popular music#Bleed-through

References

 
 C. P. Bean and J. W. Livingston, "Superparamagnetism," Journal of Applied Physics, April 1959, pages 120S-129S.
 William Manley, "Thinking about Print-Through," Audio Magazine, September, 1977, pages 55–85.
 Jay McKnight, "Tape Print-Through Reduction," Ampex Research Department Report 106, November 1957, 12 pages.
 Terence O'Kelly, "BASF Inventor's Notebook--Print-Through," Bulletin No. 9, August 1980.
 

Audio engineering